Phanera curtisii is a species of 'monkey ladder' lianas in the subfamily Cercidoideae and the tribe Bauhinieae, the genus having been separated from Bauhinia and the defunct genus Lasiobema.  
Under its synonym Bauhinia curtisii, records exist from Indochina and Malesia;.

References

External links

Cercidoideae
Flora of Indo-China
Flora of Malesia